These are the Billboard R&B singles chart number-one singles of 2000.

Chart history

See also
2000 in music
List of number-one R&B hits (United States)

References

2000
United States RandB songs
2000 in American music